Chenggong District is one of seven districts of the prefecture-level city of Kunming, the capital of Yunnan Province, Southwest China. The district was approved to build from the dissolution of the former Chenggong County by the State Council  on May 20, 2011, and situated on east bank of the Dian Lake.

Chenggong is the chief zone for Kunming, the downtown of which is almost a 20-minute drive away. It is the site of the new Kunming City Hall, and new campuses for Yunnan University and Yunnan Normal University.

Early in the district's redevelopment, much of the newly constructed housing in Chenggong was unoccupied and was reportedly one of the largest ghost towns in Asia in 2012, in a similar situation to Ordos City and the New South China Mall. It has slowly become occupied, however, in more recent years as Central Kunming has become overcrowded. Some Government departments moved to Chenggong in 2012, and a subway line connecting Chenggong to the city centre opened in 2013.  By 2017, the district had become home to many more offices and residents with more redevelopment still on the horizon.

Administrative divisions
Chenggong District is divided into ten subdistricts.
Subdistricts  Longcheng, Luolong, Dounan, Wulong, Wujiaying, Yuhua, Qidian, Luoyang, Dayu and Majinpu

Industrial park
Chenggong Industrial Park is among the 30 key industrial parks in Yunnan province, with a total planned area of 66.46 km2.

Dounan Flower Market
Dounan, near Chenggong, has the largest flower market in China. The local flower-growing business started in the 1980s, and Dounan now supplies more than half of China's cut flowers.

Transport
Kunming Changshui International Airport
China National Highway 213
Kunming Metro

See also
List of cities in the People's Republic of China
List of cities in the People's Republic of China by population
List of cities in the People's Republic of China by GDP per capita

References

External links 
Official government site
 Area Code and Postal Code in Yunnan Province
 Chenggong, one of the largest new ghost town in Asia

County-level divisions of Kunming